Jyrki Juhani Järvilehto (born 31 January 1966), better known as "JJ Lehto", is a Finnish racing driver. He won the 24 Hours of Le Mans twice, in 1995 and 2005. He is also a former Formula One driver.

He was a protégé of Finnish 1982 Formula One World Champion Keke Rosberg, who first suggested that Jyrki Järvilehto should abbreviate his name to the more manageable JJ Lehto.

Early career
Like many racing drivers Lehto began in karts at age 8, winning numerous events, before graduating to Formula Ford at the early age of 15. A switch to single seaters saw him dominate the Scandinavian Formula Ford. He then won the British and European Formula 2000 championship in 1987 and went on to win the coveted British Formula 3 title in 1988, driving for Pacific Racing. In 1989 Lehto drove in Formula 3000, again for Pacific Racing. The season was not successful and he failed to score any podium finishes. He did not participate in the last race which was held in Dijon-Prenois.

Formula One career
In 1989 Lehto tested for Ferrari before making his Formula One debut for the Onyx team as a late-season replacement for Bertrand Gachot. Though he failed to prequalify for his first race at Estoril he impressed with his speed in the tough sessions and made his first start in the following meeting. In the wet season finale at Adelaide he ran as high as 5th before retiring with waterlogged electrics. Over the summer Onyx were sold to Swiss racer turned businessman Peter Monteverdi. Lehto, marked by many as a star of the future, was paired with Gregor Foitek but financial difficulties hampered his season, leading to the team's withdrawal after the Hungarian Grand Prix (one of five events the Finn failed to qualify for – though he had been hindered by the team's poor preparation, including a driveshaft being fitted the wrong way around for several meetings, and favouritism towards Foitek, whose father was involved with the buyout).

For 1991 he was signed by the ambitious Scuderia Italia team, financed by Beppe Lucchini with a Dallara chassis, Judd V10 engines and Emanuele Pirro in the second car. Due to poor results in 1990 the cars had to prequalify but soon established themselves as decent midfield runners. In the wet San Marino Grand Prix Lehto impressed by lasting in a race of attrition to finish 3rd, scoring his first F1 points. He impressed elsewhere but did not score again through poor reliability and bad luck (only finishing on four other occasions). He stayed with the team in 1992, now paired with Pierluigi Martini and using Ferrari V12 engines but the new Dallara B192 chassis had severe handling problems. Lehto's best result was 7th at Spa, his worst a failure to qualify at the Hungaroring.

He landed the second seat (alongside Austrian Karl Wendlinger) at the new, much-anticipated Sauber team for 1993, running Ilmor engines. The season started very well as Lehto survived a late downpour at Kyalami to score 5th place on the team's debut, then finished 4th at Imola despite a late engine failure. However, after a collision with Wendlinger at Monaco his relationship with both his teammate and Sauber became frosty and his season tailed off with no more points scored.

For 1994 he saw off competition from Michele Alboreto and Luca Badoer to land the second seat at Benetton alongside Michael Schumacher. However, he injured his neck testing the new B194 in pre-season with test driver Jos Verstappen taking his place for the first two rounds of the championship. Lehto returned to the cockpit for the ill-fated San Marino Grand Prix despite some question marks over his fitness. He qualified 5th but stalled on the grid, his car being struck from behind by Pedro Lamy's Lotus. Despite running 3rd in Spain before an engine failure and scoring a point in Canada (after the disqualification of Christian Fittipaldi) it was clear his injuries had not healed fully and he was replaced once again by Verstappen for the French Grand Prix. He returned to the cockpit for the Italian and Portuguese rounds in place of the suspended Schumacher but did not impress and was released entirely soon afterwards when the team signed Johnny Herbert. This freed him up to drive in the last two rounds for Sauber – Wendlinger's injuries from an accident in practice before the 1994 Monaco GP had failed to heal and his previous replacement Andrea de Cesaris was unreachable.

Post-Formula One career

After his Formula One career stalled, and advised by his manager Keke Rosberg, Lehto joined the German Touring Car Championship, DTM, in 1995 and 1996. Even though rated highly, victories eluded him, but this loss was probably made up by his successes in GT and sports car racing.

He was a late addition to the 1995 edition of the 24 Hours of Le Mans in a McLaren F1 GTR, but he won the race outright, at his third attempt, sharing the car with Yannick Dalmas and Masanori Sekiya. Lehto was an integral part of the win, gaining the lead for the team by driving a few stints during the rainy night. While others were driving cautiously, Lehto was seen to be sliding the car, lapping at times 30sec faster than everyone else. He had three more guest appearances in the same car the next year, winning another race, before he got picked up by BMW to join the factory squad in the inaugural FIA GT season, partnering Steve Soper. Even though success came initially easily, including a win in front of his home crowd at the Thunder In Helsinki event, the might of Mercedes-Benz caught up with the McLarens and left Lehto conceding the title to former DTM rival Bernd Schneider.

After an unsuccessful 1998 campaign as a Mercedes-Benz factory driver in the American-based single-seater CART series with Team Hogan, Lehto stayed Stateside but returned to the BMW camp, which entered their V12 LMR sportscar racer in the American Le Mans Series, ALMS. Even though he ended up winning four races, Lehto lost the title on the account of a formality (he was not awarded the points gained for winning the 12 Hours of Sebring because he did not have an American racing license at that time). 2000 proved less successful as the near-unbeatable Audi R8 entered the scene.

BMW and Lehto stayed in the ALMS series, but stepped down to the GT-class with the controversial M3 GTR. The team was virtually unbeatable but Lehto lost out in the championship to the driver he shared the car with, Jörg Müller, as the latter had more fastest laps and laps in the lead to his name.

He found the M3 already not fast enough to his liking, so it was not surprising when Lehto turned down BMW's offer to join them in the European Touring Car Championship (ETCC) the following year, having to race a near standard 320i tin-top racer. 2002 started with unemployment, but he was picked up by Cadillac as an addition to their Northstar LMP sportscar programme at Le Mans and in the ALMS series. Although the car was not on the pace of the Audi R8s or Panoz LMPs, the car's fortunes did seem to turn for the better when it started to notch up regular podium finishes in the second half of the year. Cadillac's mother company General Motors pulled the plug on the project, leaving Lehto again without a job if it had not been for Champion Racing, who offered him a drive in their Audi R8.

Lehto won four times in 2003 (including the prestigious Petit Le Mans event at Road Atlanta), but it was not until the factory Audi squad left the ALMS series that he was finally able to reap full rewards in 2004 and score his first championship success since his 1988 title in the British Formula Three, picking up six victories on the way.

A disappointing second half of the 2005 season prevented him from scoring double championship success, but nonetheless he managed to end his last year in full-time racing on an impressive note when winning both the 12 Hours of Sebring and the 24 Hours of Le Mans again.

In 2006 it was announced the Solaroli team would purchase two Porsche RS Spyders to be entered in the ALMS series. One car would be driven by Lehto, partnered by Johnny Herbert. However, even though getting confirmation about the deal going through in early 2007, nothing ever materialised.

Lehto did show up at the 2007 edition of the 24 Hours of Daytona to team up with Colin Braun and Max Papis in the Krohn Racing Pontiac-Riley. His first participation in the event was not a success though as the car suffered from a misfire, and after having spent a long time in the pits, finished 17th.

In 2008 he made an unexpected return to the race tracks when he showed up at the Malaysian Grand Prix to drive in the Speedcar support race, taking over the No. 90 car previously vacated by Narain Karthikeyan.

In 2001 Lehto joined Finnish television as an expert race commentator and remained a mainstay at MTV3's Finnish Formula One race broadcasts (and also for the pay-channel MTV3 MAX) until 2010, alongside Oskari Saari.

Boating accident 

On 17 June 2010, Lehto was involved in a boating accident in Ekenäs. The accident happened when the boat carrying Lehto and his friend, whose identity was not released, hit the base of a bridge in a canal. Lehto was injured and the other man was killed in the accident. Lehto had been drinking throughout the day and was heavily intoxicated at the time of the accident.

In January 2011, Ilta-Sanomat reported that the police investigations had concluded that no one besides Lehto could have been driving the boat at the time of the accident.  Lehto faced charges of negligent homicide, reckless driving and driving under the influence. Regardless of the pending trial, Lehto made a return to sportscasting on the Finnish sports-channel UrhoTV, commentating on a DTM event. On 14 December 2011,  the District Court found Lehto guilty of drunk sailing and negligent homicide, and sentenced him to two years and four months in prison. Lehto however appealed the decision, and on 30 November 2012, the Court of Appeal cleared him of all charges relating to the accident,  finding the evidence regarding who had been driving the boat inconclusive.

Racing record

Career summary

Complete British Formula 3 results
(key) (Races in bold indicate pole position) (Races in italics indicate fastest lap)

Complete Macau Grand Prix results

Complete International Formula 3000 results
(key)

Complete Formula One results
(key)

Complete 24 Hours of Le Mans results

Complete Deutsche Tourenwagen Meisterschaft/Masters results

Complete International Touring Car Championship

American open-wheel racing results
(key)

CART

Complete American Le Mans Series results

References

External links 

1966 births
Living people
Sportspeople from Espoo
Finnish racing drivers
British Formula Three Championship drivers
International Formula 3000 drivers
24 Hours of Le Mans drivers
24 Hours of Le Mans winning drivers
Finnish Formula One drivers
Onyx Formula One drivers
Scuderia Italia Formula One drivers
Sauber Formula One drivers
Benetton Formula One drivers
Deutsche Tourenwagen Masters drivers
FIA GT Championship drivers
American Le Mans Series drivers
Speedcar Series drivers
Champ Car drivers
World Sportscar Championship drivers
12 Hours of Sebring drivers
BMW M drivers
Hogan Racing drivers
Team Rosberg drivers
Team Joest drivers
Schnitzer Motorsport drivers
TOM'S drivers